Álvaro Juan de la Torre Sánchez (born 20 October 1999), known as Álvaro Juan, is a Spanish footballer who plays as an attacking midfielder for Cultural y Deportiva Leonesa, on loan from AD Alcorcón.

Club career
Born in Talavera de la Reina, Toledo, Castilla–La Mancha, Álvaro Juan finished his formation with Atlético Madrid. In July 2018, he joined Rayo Vallecano and was initially assigned to the reserves in Tercera División.

Álvaro Juan made his senior debut with the B-team on 26 August 2018, playing the last 15 minutes in a 2–1 home win against CD San Fernando de Henares. He scored his first goal on 9 September, netting his team's second in a 2–2 home draw against Las Rozas CF.

On 2 September 2020, Álvaro Juan signed for AD Alcorcón and was initially assigned to the B-team also in the fourth tier. He made his first team debut on 26 October, coming on as a late substitute for Álex Escardó in a 0–2 home loss against RCD Mallorca.

On 31 January 2021, Álvaro Juan joined Segunda División B side Cultural y Deportiva Leonesa on loan for the remainder of the season. On 27 July, his loan was extended for a further year, with the club now in Primera División RFEF.

References

External links

1999 births
Living people
People from Talavera de la Reina
Sportspeople from the Province of Toledo
Spanish footballers
Footballers from Castilla–La Mancha
Association football midfielders
Segunda División players
Segunda División B players
Tercera División players
Rayo Vallecano B players
AD Alcorcón B players
AD Alcorcón footballers
Cultural Leonesa footballers